Lay Raz (also Romanized as Lāy Raz) is a village in Rostaq Rural District, in the Central District of Neyriz County, Fars Province, Iran. At the 2006 census, its population was 9, in 7 families.

References 

Populated places in Neyriz County